Vidapanakal is a village in Anantapur district of the Indian state of Andhra Pradesh. It is the mandal headquarters of Vidapanakal mandal in Anantapur revenue division.

Geography 
It has an average elevation of 443 metres (1456 ft).

Demographics 
According to Indian census, 2001, the demographic details of Vidapanakal mandal is as follows:
 Total Population: 	48,353	in 9,116 Households.
 Male Population: 	24,587	and Female Population: 	23,766
 Children Under 6-years of age: 	6,897	(Boys -	and Girls -	3,342)
 Total Literates: 	19,138

References 

Villages in Anantapur district
Mandal headquarters in Anantapur district